= Tisean =

TISEAN (acronym for Time Series Analysis) is a software package for the analysis of time series with methods based on the theory of nonlinear dynamical systems. It was developed by Rainer Hegger, Holger Kantz and Thomas Schreiber and is distributed under the GPL licence. Two highly cited scientific publications serve as an introduction to the methods addressed in the package: the article "Practical implementation of nonlinear time series methods: The TISEAN package" and the book "Nonlinear time series analysis".
